The 1948 Honduran Amateur League was the second edition of the Honduran Amateur League.  F.C. Motagua obtained its 1st national title.  The season ran from 11 July to 26 October 1948.

Regional champions

Known results

National championship round
Played in a single round-robin format between the regional champions and current champions C.D. Victoria.  Also known as the Cuadrangular.  The game between F.C. Motagua and Victoria played at Estadio Tiburcio Carías Andino became the first and only game as of today in Honduran football history that had three 15 minutes extra times.  This happened in the very last match of the final round which Victoria won 3–2, a score that resulted in both teams finishing with 4 points each.  After 135 minutes of exhausting play, the game remained tied and the title undecided.  This forced the decision to play a rematch which ended in a 2–2 draw, forcing yet another rematch which was finally won by Motagua.

Known results

Motagua's lineup

References

Liga Amateur de Honduras seasons
Honduras
1948 in Honduras